Buddhacharita is an epic poem in the Sanskrit mahakavya style on the life of Gautama Buddha by  of Sāketa (modern Ayodhya), composed in the early second century CE. 

The author has prepared an account of the Buddha's life and teachings which, unlike other treatments such as Mahavastu (“Great Story”) and Lalitavistara (“Full Description of the Play [of the Buddha]”), is not only artistically arranged but also restrained in the description of the miracles of Gautam Buddha. His work also reflects a vast knowledge of Indian mythology and pre-Buddhist philosophy, as well as a court poet's interest in love, war and statecraft.

Of the poem's 28 cantos, only first 14 are extant in Sanskrit are complete (cantos 15 to 28 are in incomplete form). But in Chinese (5th century) and Tibetan translations all 28 chapters are preserved. In 420 AD, Dharmakṣema made a Chinese translation, and in the 7th or 8th century, a Tibetan version was composed by an unknown author which "appears to be much closer to the original Sanskrit than the Chinese".

English translations
E.B. Cowell, trans. The Buddha Carita or the Life of the Buddha, Oxford, Clarendon 1894, reprint: New Delhi, 1977. PDF (14,8 MB)
Samuel Beal, trans. The Fo-Sho-Hing-Tsan-King. Oxford, 1883. English translation of the Chinese version PDF (17,7 MB)
E. H. Johnston, trans. The Buddhacarita or Acts of the Buddha. Lahore, 1936. 2 vols. (Cantos 1-14 in Sanskrit and English). Reprint: Delhi, Motilal Barnasidass 1978
E. H. Johnston, trans. (1937), "The Buddha's Mission and last Journey: Buddhacarita, xv to xxviii", Acta Orientalia, 15: 26-62, 85-111, 231-292.
Patrick Olivelle, trans. Life of the Buddha. Clay Sanskrit Library, 2008. 1 vols. (Cantos 1-14 in Sanskrit and English with summary of the Chinese cantos not available in the Sanskrit)
 Willemen, Charles, trans. (2009), Buddhacarita: In Praise of Buddha's Acts, Berkeley, Numata Center for Buddhist Translation and Research.

Other Language Translations
Bhaskar Hanumath Kompella, Telugu Translation in the form of Tika (Word by Word meanings) and Tatparya (Substance). Buddha Charitam, Ajo-Vibho-Kandalam Publications, Hyderabad, 2018
Bhavanath Jha. Buddha-charitam Restored into Sanskrit verses by Pt. Bhavanath Jha. (Contains a re-translation back into Sanskrit of the lost cantos). Mahavir Mandir Prakashan.

See also
 Lalitavistara Sūtra

References

External links
Multilingual edition of Buddhacarita in the Bibliotheca Polyglotta
Cowell's edition in Roman characters with supplements from Johnson's edition
Same in Devanagari characters
Cowell's text and translation (verse by verse)
Cowell's translation (only)
Buddhist Studies: Buddhacarita

Epic poems in Sanskrit
Indian poetry
2nd-century Indian books
2nd-century poems
Gautama Buddha
Buddhist poetry
Ancient Indian poems
Ancient indian Dramas